The Gate School is the historic former school in Gate, Washington. The one room schoolhouse was built in 1910. The frame building features a gable roof, eaves with decorative brackets, exposed rafter tails, a brick chimney, and a square bell tower. After the school consolidated with Rochester's school district in 1941, the school building became a community center. The school was added to the National Register of Historic Places on July 19, 1990.

References

National Register of Historic Places in Thurston County, Washington
School buildings completed in 1910
Buildings and structures in Thurston County, Washington
Schools in Thurston County, Washington